Sarah Beard (born May 21, 1991) is an American sport shooter. She won the silver medal in the women's 50 metres rifle three positions event at the 2019 Pan American Games held in Lima, Peru.

At the 2018 Shooting Championships of the Americas held in Guadalajara, Mexico, she won a total of five gold medals and one bronze medal.

References

External links 
 

Living people
1991 births
Place of birth missing (living people)
American female sport shooters
Pan American Games medalists in shooting
Pan American Games gold medalists for the United States
Pan American Games bronze medalists for the United States
Shooters at the 2011 Pan American Games
Shooters at the 2019 Pan American Games
Medalists at the 2011 Pan American Games
Medalists at the 2019 Pan American Games
21st-century American women
20th-century American women